Jean de Courtenay Isherwood OAM, FRAS, AWI,  (1911–2006),  was an Australian watercolour and oil painter, and teacher, renowned for her colourful depictions of the Australian countryside.

Biography 

Isherwood was born in Marrickville, Sydney in 1911. At the age of fourteen she won a scholarship to the National Art School at East Sydney Technical College.  In the dramatic architectural surroundings which had previously comprised Darlinghurst Gaol, Isherwood learned an appreciation of linear perspective and accurate draughtsmanship which she later applied with great skill to her rural landscapes.

In 1929 she commenced work as a fashion artist with an advertising agency, continuing her studies for a further five years at the National Art School and Royal Art Society as an evening student. She later worked as a freelance artist and illustrator.  Isherwood's first exhibited work with the Australian Watercolour Institute in 1934 was a small painting of a building site. From that time she became a frequent exhibitor in major art exhibitions. She was a student of Antonio Dattilo Rubbo.

She became part of the Sydney bohemian art scene, and met John Dabron whom she married in 1940. They moved to Springwood in the Blue Mountains and had two children, Josephine and Jacqueline. They divorced in 1948 After the divorce, she returned to fashion drawing and illustration to support herself, pursuing her art interests, as she had before, on the weekend. She took up full-time painting in 1952.

From 1961 to 1974, Isherwood taught at the National Art School. This was a period of conflicting views in the teaching of art in Sydney, a time when a disciplinary approach to the skills of perspective, anatomy and design was considered by many of both the teachers and students alike as passé and unnecessary to the creation of works of art, the stylistic vogue in teaching being Abstract Expressionism.   Jean Isherwood was one of the several teachers who determinedly maintained the opposite position.  An exacting teacher, she stalked her perspective drawing students with a kneadable putty eraser in hand, challenging their skills with arrangements of battered metal rubbish bins, piles of broken chairs and, on rainy days, a dripping sixteen-rib umbrella. It was said of Miss Isherwood that no student escaped her class without being able to draw parallel lines and precise ellipses, freehand.

In 1959 Isherwood travelled around New South Wales by car. From that time onwards, she became primarily a landscape painter, and, through her attachment to the countryside, a major exhibitor in the art competitions held in conjunction with the shows run by the local Agricultural Societies and culminating each year in the Sydney Royal Easter Show with its exhibition attracting hundreds of entrants. From 1950 until her death Isherwood won more than 100 first prizes in various art competitions.

"My Country"
In 1974 Isherwood made a trip to Central Australia. On her return journey, passing through Tamworth, New South Wales, she was struck by the beauty of the countryside of that region and in 1976 purchased a property at Moonbi, where she was to live until 1987 when she moved to Tamworth.

Isherwood, as a child, and like most other Australian children for many years, learnt by heart Dorothea Mackellar's iconic poem, "My Country", in which an Australian explains to an English listener how she is not moved by the gentle landscape of England with soft, dim skies and green lanes, but by the harsh beauty of Australia.

In 1982 Isherwood heard on the radio that a statue was to be erected as a memorial to Dorothea Mackellar at Gunnedah, on Australia Day, 26 January 1983. Isherwood had long had it in mind to create a series of works illustrating the writer's most famous poem. Prompted by the imminent celebration, Isherwood created a series of thirty four watercolour paintings for exhibition in Gunnedah in conjunction with the unveiling of the statue. 

The images represent the diversity of the Australian landscape and include "the filmy veil of greenness' seen from Isherwood's own window, a flood on the Darling River, a bushfire in the Blue Mountains and a forest of ringbarked trees near Armidale. This latter painting is one of Isherwood's most masterly works, showing her exceptional control over both the watercolour technique and perspective. As is usual in a watercolour, those parts of the painting which are white are left unpainted, in this case a forest of dead tree trunks. In the narrow spaces between the array of trees Isherwood has painted a landscape that rolls away in layers to the distance. The subject would have been impressive, in oils. In watercolour, however, the technical demands are extraordinary, as is the facility with which it has been achieved. The paintings were eventually put on permanent display in the Gunnedah Bicentennial Regional Gallery. Isherwood set about painting a series of oils based on the watercolours. These were exhibited at the Artarmon Galleries in Sydney in 1986.

In November 2004, Isherwood exhibited with seven other well-known Australian artists, all over the age of eighty at an exhibition called Eighty and Over, at Max Taylor's Gallery at Summer Hill, Sydney. 
Jean Isherwood died at home on 6 January 2006, aged 94 years. Her funeral notice requested that those attending should wear bright colours.

Exhibitions, societies and awards
 
From 1946, Isherwood had nineteen exhibitions, of which three were with her daughter, Jaqueline Dabron, in the state capitals of Sydney, Brisbane and Melbourne. A retrospective exhibition was held in the New South Wales regional galleries of Tamworth and Muswellbrook. In 2012, thirty-two of Isherwood's watercolors were featured in Sister Cities, the inaugural exhibition of Gallery Lane Cove on Sydney's north shore. Her portrait of Marjorie Cotton was exhibited in First Ladies: Significant Australian Women 1913-2013 at the National Portrait Gallery in Canberra. Her work is represented in the National Gallery of Australia, Canberra; the Art Gallery of NSW; the Howard Hinton Collection, Armidale Regional Gallery; the Tamworth Art Gallery, the National Portrait Gallery, Canberra and many other regional galleries and private collections.

Isherwood was a member of the Australian Watercolour Institute from 1948 and a member of the Royal Art Society from 1976, being elected a Fellow in 1982. In 1994 Jean Isherwood was awarded the Order of Australia Medal for her contribution to the Arts for painting in oils and watercolours.

Notes

References 
 The Australian Watercolour Institute
 Dabron, Joe (2006) "Vibrancy was the core of her work: Jean de Courtenay Isherwood, Painter, 1911-2006", in The Sydney Morning Herald, 29 March 2006, p. 29
 Isherwood's Obituary ABC News
 Dorothea Mackellar Society
 Artnews

External links
 Jean Isherwood at Australian Art

1911 births
2006 deaths
Recipients of the Medal of the Order of Australia
Australian women painters
People from Marrickville
Australian watercolourists
20th-century Australian painters
20th-century Australian women artists
Women watercolorists